Reid Larkin Neilson was the managing director of the Church History Department of the Church of Jesus Christ of Latter-day Saints (LDS Church) from 2010 to 2019. On January 23, 2015, he became an Assistant Church Historian and Recorder, still retaining his duties as managing director.

Early life and education 
Neilson was raised in Orange County, California.

After graduating from Brigham Young University (BYU) in 1996 with a Bachelor of Arts in international relations, he worked for Arthur Andersen and The Walt Disney Company's Strategic Planning Division in Tokyo, where he had served years previously as a Mormon missionary in Japan. He returned to BYU for master's degrees in American history and business administration, which he received in 2001 and 2002. While a graduate student at BYU, Neilson was part of a summer seminar on Mormon History with Richard Bushman, which ran over several years, and has produced many of the leading figures in the production of scholarly Mormon history in the early 21st-century. Neilson completed a PhD in American religious history from the University of North Carolina at Chapel Hill in 2006. He also completed Harvard Business School's General Management Program.

Career 
From 2006 to 2009, Neilson was a professor in BYU's Church History and Doctrine Department.

Neilson started working for the Church History Department in 2009. In addition to working on the creation of books and editing new document collections, Neilson works on the creation of web-resources and historical sites by the department. He is also involved in the dedication of expanded and refurbished historical sites.

In January 2019, the LDS Church announced that he would begin service in July 2019 as president of the church's Washington DC North Mission.

Family 
Neilson is married to the former Shelly Anderson. They are the parents of five children.

Publications
Neilson has written and edited more than twenty books. Some of his frequent topics are the travels of Mormon figures, such as Andrew Jenson and David O. McKay. Many of his books have been published by major university presses.

Peter Neilson Sr.: A Consecrated Life. Community Press, 1997. author
From the Green Hills of England to the Red Hills of Dixie: The Story of William and Rachel Thompson Atkin. Red Rock Publishing, 2000. Author.
The Japanese Missionary Journals of Elder Alma O. Taylor, 1901–10. BYU Studies, 2001. . Editor.
Believing History: Latter-day Saint Essays. Columbia University Press, 2004.  Co-editor along with Jed Woodworth, Richard L. Bushman was the author. Author.
The Rise of Mormonism. Columbia University Press, 2005.  Book by Rodney Stark with Neilson as editor of this volume.
Taking the Gospel to the Japanese, 1901–2001. Brigham Young University Press, 2006.  author
The Mormon History Association's Tanner Lectures: The First Twenty Years. University of Illinois Press, 2006.  Neilson was co-editor along with Dean L. May.
Reflections of a Mormon Historian: Leonard J. Arrington on the New Mormon History. Arthur H. Clark Company at the University of Oklahoma Press, 2006. . Co-editor along with Sarah Prete and Ronald W. Walker.
Global Mormonism in the Twenty-First Century. Religious Studies Center at Brigham Young University, 2008. . Sole listed editor, was contributor or co-contributor of some of the contents.
Regional Studies in Latter-day Saint Church History: The Pacific Isles. Religious Studies Center, 2008. 
Proclamation to the People: Nineteenth-Century Mormonism and the Pacific Basin Frontier. University of Utah Press, 2008. 
Joseph Smith Jr.: Reappraisals after Two Centuries. Oxford University Press, 2009. 
Early Mormon Missionary Activities in Japan, 1901–1924. University of Utah Press, 2010. 
To the Peripheries of Mormondom: The Apostolic Around-the-World Journey of David O. McKay, 1920–1921. University of Utah Press, 2010. 
Exhibiting Mormonism: The Latter-day Saints and the 1893 Chicago World’s Fair. Oxford University Press, 2011. 
In the Whirlpool: The Pre-Manifesto Letters of President Wilford Woodruff to the William Atkin Family, 1885–1890. Arthur H. Clark Company, 2011. 
Tales from the World Tour: The 1895–1897 Travel Writings of Mormon Historian Andrew Jenson. Religious Studies Center, 2012. 
Go Ye Into All the World: The Growth and Development of Mormon Missionary Work. Religious Studies Center, 2012. 
Religion, Food, and Eating in North America. Columbia University Press, 2014. 
Exploring Book of Mormon Lands: The 1923 Travel Writings of Mormon Historian Andrew Jenson. Religious Studies Center, 2014. 
A Zion Canyon Reader. University of Utah Press, 2014. 
The Columbia Sourcebook of Mormons in the United States. Columbia University Press, 2014. . Edited with Terryl L. Givens. Received the 2015 Mormon History Association Best Document Editing/Bibliography Award.
Conversations with Mormon Historians. Religious Studies Center, 2015. . Edited with Alexander L. Baugh.
Rediscovering the Sites of the Restoration: The 1888 Travel Writings of Mormon Historian Andrew Jenson, Edward Stevenson, and Joseph S. Black. Religious Studies Center, 2015. . Edited with Justin R. Bray and Alan D. Johnson.
From the Outside Looking In: Essays on Mormon History, Theology, and Culture. Oxford University Press, 2015. . Coeditor with Matthew J. Grow.
A Historian in Zion: The Autobiography of Andrew Jenson, Assistant Church Historian. Religious Studies Center, 2016.  Coeditor with R. Mark Melville.
Settling the Valley, Proclaiming the Gospel: The General Epistles of the Mormon First Presidency. Oxford University Press, 2017.   Coeditor with Nathan N. Waite.
A Voice in the Wilderness: The 1888-1930 General Conference Sermons of Mormon Historian Andrew Jenson. Oxford University Press, 2018.  Coeditor with Scott D. Marianno.
The Saints Abroad: Missionaries Who Answered Brigham Young's 1852 Call to the Nations of the World. Religious Studies Center, 2019.  Coeditor with R. Mark Melville.
Pacific Apostle: The 1920-21 Diary of David O. McKay in the Latter-day Saint Island Missions. University of Illinois Press, 2020.  Coeditor with Carson V. Teuscher.
Restless Pilgrim: Andrew Jenson's Quest for Latter-day Saint History. University of Illinois Press, 2022.  Coauthor with Scott D. Marianno.

See also
Andrew Jenson
Richard E. Turley, Jr.

References

External links 
 http://www.reidneilson.com

Historians of the Latter Day Saint movement
Brigham Young University alumni
Brigham Young University faculty
University of North Carolina at Chapel Hill alumni
Harvard Business School alumni
Living people
Latter Day Saints from Utah
Latter Day Saints from North Carolina
American Mormon missionaries in Japan
Year of birth missing (living people)